Ines Jaouadi (born 15 September 1989) is a Tunisian handball player for ASF Teboulba and the Tunisian national team.

She participated at the 2011 World Women's Handball Championship in Brazil.

References

1989 births
Living people
Tunisian female handball players
20th-century Tunisian women
21st-century Tunisian women